Knights of Columbus-Indiana Club is a historic Knights of Columbus building located at South Bend, St. Joseph County, Indiana. It was built in 1924, and is a three-story, Renaissance Revival style brick and terra cotta building. The building features round arched windows with radiating voussoirs of brick and terra cotta.

It was listed on the National Register of Historic Places in 1985.

See also
 List of Knights of Columbus buildings

References

Knights of Columbus buildings in the United States
Clubhouses on the National Register of Historic Places in Indiana
Renaissance Revival architecture in Indiana
Buildings and structures completed in 1924
Buildings and structures in South Bend, Indiana
National Register of Historic Places in St. Joseph County, Indiana